Blood & Guts is a 2014 non-fiction book by Australian writer Sam Vincent. It deals with the conflicts over modern whaling, mainly dealing with Japanese whaling and the campaign run by Sea Shepherd Conservation Society against it.

References

Books about whaling
Australian non-fiction books
2014 non-fiction books
Black Inc books